Holden is the Australian subsidiary of the automobile manufacturer General Motors (GM). Since Holden's inception as a marque in 1948, the vast majority of its vehicles have been marketed with a nameplate, for example, the Holden Kingswood and Holden Commodore, with "Kingswood" and "Commodore" representative of this. The exceptions to this trend are the 48-215 series "Holden sedan" (1948–1953), the Holden Standard-based utility and panel van body styles (1951–1968), and the Holden Belmont-based utilities and panel vans from 1974 through to 1984. For this reason, these cars are excluded from this list, and are instead covered in the list of Holden vehicles by series.

Holden Acadia 

The Acadia was a rebadged GMC Acadia for the Australian market.

Holden Adventra 

The Adventra was an all-wheel drive wagon variant of the Holden Commodore.

Holden Apollo 

The Apollo was a re-badged Toyota Camry for the Australian market.

Holden Astra 

The Holden Astra was a rebadged Nissan Pulsar from 1984 to 1989 and a rebadged Opel Astra from 1995 to 2020. The Astra sedan from 2016 to 2020 was a rebadged Chevrolet Cruze.

Holden Barina 

The Holden Barina was a rebadged Suzuki Cultus from 1985 to 1994, a rebadged Opel Corsa from 1994 to 2005, and a rebadged Daewoo Kalos (Chevrolet Aveo (T200)) from 2005 to 2018.

Holden Belmont

Holden Berlina 

The Berlina was a nameplate used for the entry luxury version of the Holden Commodore. It was discontinued in 2013.

Holden Brougham

Holden Business

Holden Calais 

The Calais was the nameplate for the luxury version of the Holden Commodore. It was discontinued in 2017.

Holden Calibra 

The Calibra was a rebadged Opel Calibra for the Australian market.

Holden Camira 

The Camira was Holden's version of General Motors' J-body platform.

Holden Caprice 

See Statesman for Statesman Caprice models 1974 to 1985.

The Caprice was a long-wheelbase version of the Commodore sedan.

Holden Captiva 

The Captiva was a rebadged Chevrolet Captiva / Opel Antara for the Australian market.

Holden Cascada 

The Captiva was a rebadged Opel Cascada for the Australian market.

Holden Colorado 

The Captiva was a rebadged version of the Thai-built Chevrolet Colorado for the Australian market.

Holden Combo

Holden Commodore

Holden Crewman

Holden Cruze

Holden Drover

Holden Epica

Holden Equinox

Holden Frontera

Holden Gemini

Holden GTS

Holden Insignia

Holden Jackaroo

Holden Kingswood

Holden Limited Edition

Holden Malibu

Holden Monaro

Holden Monterey

Holden Nova

Holden One Tonner

Holden Piazza

Holden Premier

Holden Rodeo

Holden Sandman

Holden Scurry

Holden Shuttle

Holden Spark

Holden Special

Holden Standard

Holden Statesman 

See Statesman for Statesman models 1971 to 1985.

Holden Suburban

Holden Sunbird

Holden Tigra

Holden Torana

Holden TrailBlazer

Holden Trax

Holden Ute

Holden Vectra

Holden Viva

Holden Volt

Holden Zafira

Notes 

Holden